Kazayak-Khusnullino (Qaźayaq-Xösnulla) is a rural locality (a village) in Krasnovoskhodsky Selsoviet, Iglinsky District, Bashkortostan, Russia. The population was 53 as of 2010. There are 2 streets.

Geography 
Kazayak-Khusnullino is located 70 km east of Iglino (the district's administrative centre) by road. Kazayak is the nearest rural locality.

References 

Rural localities in Iglinsky District